Subang Jaya is a city in Petaling District, Selangor, Malaysia. It comprises the southern third district of Petaling. It consists of the neighbourhoods from SS12 to SS19, UEP Subang Jaya (USJ), Putra Heights, Batu Tiga as well as PJS7, PJS9 and PJS11 of Bandar Sunway, the latter of which are partially jurisdictional within Petaling Jaya under the MBPJ. The city is governed by Subang Jaya City Council (MBSJ), which also governs other areas of the Petaling district, such as Puchong and Seri Kembangan. According to Subang Jaya City Council, Subang Jaya has a population of 642,100 in 2015, which makes it the sixth largest city in Malaysia by population.

History
Before 1974, what is today Subang Jaya was part of Klang District. Development on Subang Jaya began on 21 February 1976 and was concluded in 1988 by Sime UEP Properties Berhad, the property development arm of the Malaysian conglomerate Sime Darby. The site was formerly a rubber plantation called Seafield Estate under the municipality of Petaling Jaya. Upon completion of Subang Jaya in the same year, Sime UEP began clearing land for the development of USJ. In 1999, Sime UEP began the development of Putra Heights which is located on the southern end of Subang Jaya.

In 1997, Subang Jaya received the status of a municipality, elevating the Petaling District Council to Subang Jaya Municipal Council. The municipal comprise the areas administered by the former Petaling District Council, as well as some areas transferred from Petaling Jaya, Puchong and Shah Alam. This means that the MPSJ municipal holds local government authority not only in the Subang Jaya city centre, but also USJ, Putra Heights, Batu Tiga, Bandar Sunway, Puchong, Bandar Kinrara, Seri Kembangan, and Balakong. In parliamentary terms, Subang Jaya's municipal area covers the parliamentary constituency of Puchong and Subang in its entirety, as well as parts of Kota Raja which mainly cover Putra Heights. On the west side of Subang Jaya,  covers areas like Subang Hi-Tech Industrial Park, Taman Mutiara Subang, Taman Subang Mas and Tropicana Metropark. Subang Jaya city itself lies within the Subang constituency, while Seri Kembangan and Puchong fall within the Puchong constituency. In Dec 2019, it was officially announced that Subang Jaya's municipality will be upgraded to a city council after a long 5-year wait since MPSJ's application in 2014.

Governance

Commerce
Subang Parade, Empire Subang, Sunway Pyramid, and SS15 Courtyard are the main shopping attractions around the areas of the Subang Jaya city centre. In the adjacent township of Bandar Sunway, there is Sunway Lagoon, an amusement water theme park which is a tourist landmark across the nation. The commercial district of SS15 serves as Subang Jaya's central entertainment and business area. Within the area, there is also an abundance of international F&B outlets, cafes, dining restaurants, boutique outlets and banks.  There are plenty of high-rise office buildings and serviced residences surrounding the area as well. 

In USJ, there are shopping malls such as Da Men, Main Place, One City, The Summit, The 19 USJ City Mall, Giant USJ and Mydin USJ to provide more shopping options. The main commercial hub of the USJ township is USJ Taipan which is a bustling business area. There are many small-scale commercial areas scattering around the neighbourhoods of USJ to provide amenities and conveniences as well.

Recreation
The most renowned and largest recreation park in Subang Jaya is the Subang Ria Park, situated nearby the Sime Darby Medical Centre in SS12. During its heyday in the 1990s, the park was a boating place with tennis court, paintball and go-karting arenas. As of 2015, it was a park mainly used for jogging activities, with a deterioration in the condition of other resources in the park after a number of years of neglect. For an urban park experience, there is Tropicana Metropark which contains a  central park with features like a man-made lake with a bio-filtration system to prevent mosquito breeding, a pedestrian promenade and a food-and-beverage strip for alfresco indulgence.

The MBSJ Stadium in USJ 5 comprises a large football turf and an athletic running field. Hypermedia library, petting zoo and art gallery can be found at Kompleks 3C MPSJ in SS13. There are many indoor soccer centres, squash, tennis and badminton courts in Subang Jaya. Golf clubs include the Subang Racquet and Golf Club, Subang National Golf Club Glenmarie Golf & Country Club and Saujana Golf and Country Club.

Economy
Subang Jaya is renowned as a light industrial hub in the Klang Valley. The main industrial areas in the city are Subang Industrial Park SS13, Sime UEP Industrial Park, Subang Hi-Tech Industrial Park and USJ 1 through USJ 8, involving in both light and heavy industry.

The Malaysia headquarters of Proton Holdings, the Centre of Excellence; Lotus Cars, Faber-Castell and many other major international companies are located in Sime UEP Industrial Park.

Education

Subang Jaya is well known as a higher-education hub, comprising many large international private colleges and universities. It also consists of over 30 primary and secondary schools including local, private and international.

Primary schools 

 At-tamimi International Islamic School 
 Fairview International School
 GEMS International School
 Kingsley International School 
 Sekolah Kebangsaan Sri Subang Jaya
 Sekolah Kebangsaan Seri Selangor
 Sekolah Kebangsaan Subang Jaya
 Sekolah Wawasan (USJ 15)
 Sekolah Kebangsaan Bandar Sunway
 Sekolah Kebangsaan Dato Onn Jaafar
 Sekolah Cina Tun Tan Cheng Lock
 Sekolah Tamil Tun Sambathan
 Sekolah Kebangsaan Seafield 3
 Sekolah Kebangsaan USJ 12
 Sekolah Kebangsaan SS14
 Sekolah Kebangsaan Perdana Jaya SS 19
 Sekolah Kebangsaan SS19
 Sekolah Tamil Seafield
 Sekolah Kebangsaan Seafield (USJ 6)
 Sekolah Kebangsaan USJ 2
 Sekolah Cina Chee Wen (USJ 1)
 Sekolah Cina Lick Hung (SS19)
 Sekolah Kebangsaan USJ 20
 Sekolah Rendah Islam Integrasi Masjid darul Ehsan (SS15)
 UCSI International School
 Sri UCSI (Primary)
 Sri Kuala Lumpur Primary School
 Sunway International School

Secondary schools

 At-tamimi International Islamic School 
 Eagles Grammar International School
 Fairview International School
 GEMS International School
 Kingsley International School 
 Japanese School of Kuala Lumpur (JSKL)
 Sekolah Menengah Kebangsaan SS17
 Sekolah Menengah Kebangsaan USJ 4
 Sekolah Menengah Kebangsaan Seafield 
 Sekolah Menengah Kebangsaan USJ 8
 Sekolah Menengah Kebangsaan USJ 12
 Sekolah Menengah Kebangsaan USJ 13
 Sekolah Menengah Kebangsaan USJ 23
 Sekolah Menengah Kebangsaan USJ 4
 Sekolah Agama Menengah Bestari USJ 5
 Sekolah Menengah Kebangsaan Subang Jaya SS14
 Sekolah Menengah Kebangsaan Subang Utama SS18
 Sirius Scholar Education Center
 Sri Kuala Lumpur Secondary School
 UCSI International School
 Sri UCSI Secondary School  
 Sunway International School

Higher education
 ALFA International College
 At-tamimi International A Level School
 Cilantro Culinary Academy
 International Medical College
 INTI International University
 Monash University
 SEGi University College
 Sunway TES
 Sunway College
 Sunway University
 Taylor's College
 Taylor's University
 The One Academy
 Westminster International College
 International College IMPERiA

Healthcare

Healthcare in Subang Jaya is provided by two private hospitals. They are Sime Darby Medical Centre Subang Jaya, (formerly known as Subang Jaya Medical Centre (SJMC)) in SS12 along with Sunway Medical Centre in Bandar Sunway.

Under the 9th Malaysian Plan, Subang Jaya has its first public health clinic called the 1 Malaysia Healthcare located in Taman Subang Mewah area of USJ 1. Its primary objective is to provide cheaper healthcare for lower to middle-income population.

Places of worship
The Hindu Temple Sri Varatharajah Perumal Temple and Gurdwara Sahib Subang are located in SS13, near the intersection between Kesas Highway and Persiaran Kewajipan. Kuil Sri Subramaniar Bandar Sunway is a prominent Hindu temple located at Bandar Sunway and is dedicated to Subramaniar (Lord Murugan)

Darul Ehsan Mosque in SS15 is the main worshipping place of Muslims in Subang Jaya. There are other alternative mosques in the city in USJ 1, USJ 9 and USJ 17.

The Church of St Thomas More, Subang Jaya (STM), is a Roman Catholic parish, located in UEP Industrial Park, USJ. The Church was officially dedicated and opened on Sunday, 10 April 2011, by Most Rev. Murphy Pakiam, Archbishop of Kuala Lumpur. The other main church of Subang Jaya is First Baptist Church in SS17. Kingdom Life Church International, a non-denominational New Testament church, is located in Jalan USJ Sentral 2, USJ 1 The Church of Jesus Christ of Latter-day Saints: With a strong congregation in Subang Jaya. Acts Church is also another Non-denominational church located in Summit USJ. The church was founded by Pr. Kenneth Chin in the year 2000.

Subang Jaya Buddhist Association (SJBA) commenced its activities in August 1989 and SJBA eventually became a community and spiritual center for many Buddhists in and around Subang Jaya. One of the memorable achievements of the Association is the successful building of the present Vihara (Temple) in 1997 on a  land obtained from the Selangor Government. The Vihara has been well utilized over these years.

Development 
Presently, there are three large mixed commercial projects under development in Subang Jaya which are SJCC Subang, SJ7 Trans-City and Tropicana Metropark. SJCC Subang and SJ7 Trans-City are two large mixed developments by Sime Darby that are set to be integrated with highly advanced public transportation. Da Men and Empire Remix are located in USJ 1. On the other hand, Empire Remix is also a mixed commercial development which consists of a few blocks of office buildings, serviced apartments and a shopping mall.

Tropicana Metropark is an  development comprising more than 10 high-rise buildings which include office suites, SOHO, office towers, business suites, villas, shopfronts and a shopping mall. It is situated near the upscale neighbourhoods of USJ Heights and Subang Heights, and is strategically located off the Federal Highway. A new access from Federal Highway will be completed by 2016 to improve the traffic flow around the area. On top of that, Bandar Raya Developments Bhd (BRDB) is developing an RM2 billion 24 acres of integrated mixed development around the same area.

Transportation

Subang Jaya is well-connected to the cities of Kuala Lumpur, Shah Alam and the townships of Petaling Jaya such as Ara Damansara, Kota Damansara, Bandar Utama, Damansara Utama and Mutiara Damansara via a network of major highways, namely the Federal Highway, Shah Alam Expressway (KESAS), NKVE, NPE, North South Expressway and LDP. There are three exits connecting Federal Highway to Subang Jaya. The two main exits are at exit 17.9 km through Persiaran Kewajipan and exit 18.2 km through Persiaran Tujuan, while the alternative exit is through Persiaran Teknologi Subang at Tropicana Metropark's direct interchange.

Persiaran Kewajipan and Persiaran Tujuan serve as the two major roads in Subang Jaya. The alternative route from USJ and Subang Jaya to Kuala Lumpur and Petaling Jaya is the Subang–Kelana Jaya Link, which also connects the Persiaran Kewajipan roundabout of the New Pantai Expressway towards the Subang Airport expressway (route 15) of Federal Highway Federal Route 2.

Subang Jaya's public transport system is highly developed, boasting 2 light rail transit (LRT) lines, 1 KTM commuter line, 1 BRT line, bus and taxi services. Since 30 June 2016, many new LRT stations of the extended Kelana Jaya Line have opened, connecting various areas in Subang Jaya with Kuala Lumpur city centre and Petaling Jaya. The LRT stations are strategically located within walking distance from shopping malls, commercial centres and residential areas and supported by feeder buses. The Kelana Jaya Line had been extended from the existing route from the Subang LRT Depot, running through the Dana 1 commercial centre in Kelana Jaya, to Kelana Centre Point, then to Subang Parade (interchange with KTM Subang Jaya commuter station) which covers three stations within the town centre. Within USJ, the LRT line continues from SS18 to USJ 7 (Da Men and Summit), USJ Taipan, Wawasan (USJ 15), USJ 21 (One City and Main Place), and ends at the main interchange station hub in Putra Heights, which connects with another LRT line, the Sri Petaling Line to Puchong, Bukit Jalil and Sri Petaling. In addition, six MRT Putrajaya line stations are located in southern part of Subang Jaya City Council area serving Seri Kembangan and Serdang.

On the other hand, public bus transportation is provided by two companies, RapidKL and Metrobus. These buses provide access around the town and also to Kuala Lumpur. Alternatively, there is a BRT line connecting the Setia Jaya Komuter station through Bandar Sunway to the USJ7 LRT Station. The BRT Sunway Line started operating on 1 June 2015, when it was officially launched by Malaysia prime minister, Najib Razak. The BRT service is a public-private partnership project between Prasarana and Sunway Group which aims to provide eco-friendly electric bus services on elevated tracks for residents in Bandar Sunway and USJ.

As for commuter train services, Subang Jaya is served by an urban-suburb rail link, the KTM Komuter, which provides transportation towards Port Klang and Kuala Lumpur.

The Sultan Abdul Aziz Shah Airport is located at Subang, Shah Alam. It serves as the main hub for turboprop airlines Firefly (a low-cost carrier subsidiary of Malaysia Airlines), Malindo Air and Berjaya Air and is the premier hub for corporate and private aviation in Southeast Asia.

Sister cities
  Hioki, Kagoshima, Japan

References

External links